Alf Roland Petersson (born 5 February 1933) is a retired Swedish sprinter.

Athletic career
He competed in the 400 m and 4 × 400 m relay at the 1960 Summer Olympics, but failed to reach the finals. He finished fifth and third in these events at the 1958 European Athletics Championships.

Petersson started as a long jumper with a personal best of 7.31 m. He then changed to 100–800 m running events, winning the national 400 m title in 1955, 1957–58 and 1960 and setting a national record in 1958 over this distance.

References

1933 births
Living people
Swedish male sprinters
Olympic athletes of Sweden
Athletes (track and field) at the 1960 Summer Olympics
European Athletics Championships medalists
Sportspeople from Helsingborg
20th-century Swedish people